Tarakeshwara or Tarakeshvara (Tārakeśvara; Hindi: Tārkeśvar) is a form of the Hindu god Shiva in his role as a psychopomp, a ferryman or deliverer of the soul into freedom from rebirth (moksha).


Temples
 Manikarnika Ghat, Benares
 Hangal, Karnataka
 Taraknath Temple, West Bengal

The temples are connected to the "Taraka", the "ferryboat mantra" or "mantra of the crossing" believed to guide the spirit of the dying to moksha. One Shivite form of the prayer is Om Sri Rama Jaya Rama Jaya Jaya Rama ("Om, Victory to God with his shakti, victory, victory to God"), supposedly taught by Shiva to his wife Parvati. Another is Rām-Rāmāya Namaḥ, taught by Yajnavalkya to Bharadvaja in the Ramottaratapaniya Upanishad. Supposedly, one dying in the temple at Benares hears Shiva himself reciting one of these mantras.

See also
 Shaivism
 Moksha

Notes

References

Citations

Bibliography
 .
 .
 .
 .
 .
 .
 .

Forms of Shiva
Psychopomps